The Srinivasa Perumal Temple in Papanasam,  Thanjavur district, Tamil Nadu, India is a Hindu temple dedicated to Lord Vishnu.

Structure 
Located at Papanasam in Thanjavur- Kumbakonam road, this temple has three tier gopura facing east.  The temple has two prakaras. Near the temple, temple tank is found. The main deity is Srinivasa Perumal.

Festivals 
The festivals conducted in this temple include Tiruvonam Adi Pournami (July-August), Thai Pournami (January-February), Hanuman Jayanthi, Vaikunda Ekadasi, Vinayaka Chadurti (August-September), and Navaratri (September-October).

Kumbhabhishekham 
The Kumbhabhishekham of this temple was held in 2017.

Reference

External links
 வைகுண்ட ஏகாதசியையொட்டி பெருமாள் கோயில்களில் சொர்க்கவாசல் திறப்பு, தினகரன், 26 டிசம்பர் 2020
 Temples in Papanasam, Srinivasa Perumal (old Visvesvara) temple, Wisdom Library

Hindu temples in Thanjavur district